Andriy Danylovych Skaba was a Ukrainian academic, historian, and director of the NASU Institute of History of Ukraine from 1968 to 1973. He was a veteran of World War II (in reserves).

Brief overview
In 1960s he was main ideologist of the Communist Party of Ukraine who between the later Khrushchev Thaw and the early Brezhnev's epoch of stagnation personified a policy of government in cultural, education, and spiritual spheres. In 1959 Skaba became a minister of restructured Ministry of Higher and General Special Education.

During his management there was a transition to the eight years of compulsory education, 82% of schools conducted their lectures in Ukrainian language, there were published multi-volume works of Ukrainian writers, established the Shevchenko Prize. At the same time in mid 1960s there intensified struggle against the nationalist intelligentsia, began persecution of Vyacheslav Chornovil, Valentyn Moroz, Ivan Drach, and others (the Sixtiers in Ukraine). Nonetheless in Moscow the management of ideological department of Central Committee of the Communist Party of Ukraine was recognized as unsatisfactory and positions of Skaba as contemplative, in his address were expressed accusations in condoning of nationalist elements.

Skaba headed a commission of Central Committee of the Communist Party of Ukraine that was conducting evaluation of the Ivan Dziuba's work "Internationalism or Russification?" and concluded<ref>Horyn, B. Not only about myself. Book 2nd. Part XXXII (Не тільки про себе. Книга друга. Частина XXХII.). Vox-populi. 22 February 2014</ref> "...that prepared by Dzyuba material "Internationalism or Russification?" is from the beginning to the end a libel ("pasquille") about the Soviet reality, national policy of Communist Party of the Soviet Union, and practice of Communist Development in the Soviet Union"''.

See also
 Petro Shelest

References

External links
 Andriy Skaba. Encyclopedia of History of Ukraine.

 

1905 births
1986 deaths
People from Poltava Oblast
People from Poltava Governorate
Members of the National Academy of Sciences of Ukraine
20th-century Ukrainian historians
National University of Kharkiv alumni
Academic staff of the National University of Kharkiv
Academic staff of the University of Lviv
NANU Institute of History of Ukraine directors
Central Committee of the Communist Party of Ukraine (Soviet Union) members
Soviet military personnel of World War II from Ukraine
Burials at Baikove Cemetery
Education ministers of the Ukrainian Soviet Socialist Republic
Fifth convocation members of the Verkhovna Rada of the Ukrainian Soviet Socialist Republic
Sixth convocation members of the Verkhovna Rada of the Ukrainian Soviet Socialist Republic
Soviet historians